Richard Smith (born 17 July 1971) is a Trinidadian cricketer. He played in 70 first-class and 46 List A matches for Trinidad and Tobago from 1990 to 2003.

See also
 List of Trinidadian representative cricketers

References

External links
 

1971 births
Living people
Trinidad and Tobago cricketers